Formed in 1870 as a consolidation of the Pana, Springfield and North Western Railroad and Illinois South Eastern Railway, the Springfield and Illinois South Eastern Railway ran from Springfield to Shawneetown, Illinois. It was under construction until at least 1871, when it was noted as having been increased by 140 miles. In 1875, the Ohio and Mississippi Railway acquired the line. It merged in 1893 with the Baltimore and Ohio Southwestern Railroad, now part of CSX Transportation.

Much of the S&ISE railbed has been abandoned.  A section adjacent to Springfield has been paved as the Lost Bridge Trail for cyclists and hikers.

References

Defunct Illinois railroads
Predecessors of the Baltimore and Ohio Railroad
Railway companies established in 1870
Railway companies disestablished in 1874
American companies established in 1870
American companies disestablished in 1874